Kentucky Peerless Distilling Company is a whiskey distillery in Louisville, Kentucky, in the United States.

Kentucky Peerless produces a 3-Year-Old small batch rye whiskey and has announced plans to release a bourbon whiskey in 2019.

References

External links
 

Whiskies of the United States
Manufacturing companies based in Louisville, Kentucky
2015 establishments in Kentucky
Distilleries in Kentucky
Food and drink companies established in 2015
American companies established in 2015